Julio Gómez (born 7 November 1931) is a Spanish middle-distance runner. He competed in the men's 800 metres at the 1960 Summer Olympics.

References

1931 births
Living people
Athletes (track and field) at the 1960 Summer Olympics
Spanish male middle-distance runners
Olympic athletes of Spain
Place of birth missing (living people)